The 2019 UEFA Nations League Finals was an international football tournament held in Portugal from 5 to 9 June 2019. The four national teams involved in the tournament were required to register a squad of 23 players, including three goalkeepers, by 26 May 2019, 10 days prior to the opening match of the tournament. Only players in these squads were eligible to take part in the tournament. In the event that a player on the submitted squad list suffered an injury or illness prior to his team's first match of the tournament, that player could be replaced, provided that the team doctor and a doctor from the UEFA Medical Committee both confirmed that the injury or illness is severe enough to prevent the player's participation in the tournament.

The position listed for each player is per the official squad lists published by UEFA. The age listed for each player is on 5 June 2019, the first day of the tournament. The numbers of caps and goals listed for each player do not include any matches played after the start of the tournament. The club listed is the club for which the player last played a competitive match prior to the tournament. The nationality for each club reflects the national association (not the league) to which the club is affiliated.

England
Manager: Gareth Southgate

England's 27-man preliminary squad was announced on 16 May 2019. The final squad was announced on 27 May.

Netherlands
Manager: Ronald Koeman

The Netherlands' 28-man preliminary squad was announced on 10 May 2019. Kenny Tete withdrew injured and was replaced by Hans Hateboer. The final squad was announced on 27 May.

Portugal
Manager: Fernando Santos

Portugal's final squad was announced on 23 May 2019.

Switzerland
Manager: Vladimir Petković

Switzerland's final squad was announced on 27 May 2019. Breel Embolo withdrew injured and was replaced by Noah Okafor on 30 May.

Notes

References

External links

2019 UEFA Nations League Finals, UEFA.com

Squads
UEFA Nations League final tournament squads